Roberto Carlos Mansilla Abellán (born 31 July 1981 in Guadalajara, Castile-La Mancha) is a Spanish footballer who plays as a central defender.

External links

Stats and bio at Cadistas1910 

1981 births
Living people
People from Guadalajara, Spain
Sportspeople from the Province of Guadalajara
Spanish footballers
Footballers from Castilla–La Mancha
Association football defenders
Segunda División players
Segunda División B players
Tercera División players
Atlético Levante UD players
Mérida UD footballers
Cádiz CF players
AD Ceuta footballers
Ontinyent CF players
CP Cacereño players